Meyerhofferite is a hydrated borate mineral of calcium, with the chemical formula  Ca2B6O6(OH)10·2H2O, CaB3O3(OH)5·H2O or Ca2(H3B3O7)2·4H2O. It occurs principally as an alteration product of inyoite, another borate mineral.

Natural meyerhofferite was discovered in 1914 in Death Valley, California It is named for German chemist Wilhelm Meyerhoffer (1864–1906), collaborator with J. H. van't Hoff on the composition and origin of saline minerals, who first synthesized the compound.

See also
 List of minerals named after people

References

Nesoborates
Calcium minerals
Triclinic minerals
Minerals in space group 2